Katrien de Craemer (born 07 June 1973) is a former Belgian tennis player. 

She has career-high WTA rankings of 561 in singles, achieved on 14 October 1991, and 377 in doubles, reached on 02 March 1992. Her only WTA Tour main-draw appearance came at the 1992 Belgian Open where she partnered Daphne van de Zande in the doubles event. They lost in the First Round to German Meike Babel and Wiltrud Probst.

ITF finals

Doubles finals (0–3)

References

External links 
 

1973 births
Living people
Belgian female tennis players
20th-century Belgian women